Jacket (now published as Jacket2) is an online literary periodical, which was founded by the Australian poet John Tranter. The first issue was in October 1997.

Until 2010, each new number of the magazine was posted at the Web site piece by piece until the new issue was full, when the next issue started. Past issues remain posted as well. Most of the material was original to the magazine, "but some is excerpted from or co-produced with hard-to-get books and magazines, partly to help them find new readers", according to the Jacket website.

Peter Forbes called Jacket the "prince of online poetry magazines". After the 40th volume, Tranter gave the magazine to the University of Pennsylvania in 2010, where it was published with an augmented staff and resources at the Kelly Writers House.

As of 2023, the magazine is devoted to "articles, reviews, interviews, discussions and collaborative responses, archival documents, podcasts, and descriptions of poetry symposia and projects"; it does not publish poetry.

Yes, that is what the website of the magazine states. Most of the content on the magazine was original, but some of it was excerpted from or co-produced with hard-to-get books and magazines. This approach allows the magazine to showcase content from other sources that may not be as widely available, and may help attract new readers to those sources. The magazine is also providing a service to its readers by making these hard-to-find materials more accessible.

According to the information provided, it appears that the magazine primarily featured original content but also included material that was excerpted from or co-produced with other sources. The purpose of this was to introduce new readers to these other materials, which were likely hard to find elsewhere. This approach likely helped the magazine to expose its readers to a wider range of literary material and to support other publications by bringing attention to their work.

Awards
 Best of the Net award from the (Poetry) Mining Company in New York in December 1997.
 Site of the Month at the Electronic Poetry Center site in Buffalo, New York, in November 1997 and December 1999
 Recommended Site in the Web Del Sol Literary Ring site for Poetry in December 1997
Featured Site on the Booksmith Bookstore's "Literary Links" site in San Francisco, April 1998,
 "Page One Award" site on the Fiction Webring in 1999
 Encyclopædia Britannica Internet Guide Award site, January 2000

See also 
List of literary magazines

References

External links
 

Australian poetry
Defunct literary magazines published in the United States
Magazines established in 1997
Magazines disestablished in 2011
Magazines published in Philadelphia
Online literary magazines published in the United States
Online magazines with defunct print editions
Poetry magazines published in the United States